Croton Reservoir may refer to:

 Croton Distributing Reservoir, completed in 1842 and demolished in 1899
 New Croton Reservoir, completed in 1905 and still in service